Jeyow Evangelista is a  Filipino filmmaker, cinematographer, and film director.

Evangelista won an honorable mention at the 21st Gawad CCP for Alternative Film & Video for his short film, "Babae Ako". He has been nominated 3 times for Best Cinematography at the Moonrise Environmental Documentary Film Festival for the documentaries; "Lawa ng Bae (2008)", "Lake Bato (2009)" and "Bamboo Lake (2009)".

Filmography
2008 Condo (Director of Photography/Co-Producer)
2009 Babae Ako (Director/Cinematographer)

Television
2009 Case Unclosed - Wala na si Neneng (Director)

External links
Jeyow Evangelista at the Internet Movie Database

References
 Cultural Center of the Philippines
 Manila Times
 Studio Cut
 21st Gawad CCP Alternative Film & Video tilt winners

Living people
Filipino film directors
Filipino cinematographers
Year of birth missing (living people)
Place of birth missing (living people)